John Newton (9 March 1920 – 9 November 1991) was a New Zealand rugby league footballer who represented New Zealand.

Playing career
Newton played for Runanga in the West Coast Rugby League competition. He represented both the West Coast and the South Island.

He was first selected for the New Zealand national rugby league team in 1946, playing against the touring Great Britain Lions. He toured Great Britain and France in 1947 and Australia in 1948 as well as playing in home tests against Australia and Great Britain.

References

1920 births
1991 deaths
New Zealand rugby league players
New Zealand national rugby league team players
West Coast rugby league team players
South Island rugby league team players
Rugby league props
Runanga players